Sai-Dham at Rani, (Rajasthan) is a replica of original Shirdi Sai Baba Temple.

Introduction

It is believed to be a very sacred, powerful and important place in Marwar Region. Sai Dham Temple attracts many visitors. The replica of Shirdi Sai Baba is made of snow white marble statue and is 5 Feet 5 Inch in height. It was made by the famous sculptor Bharadwaj of Jaipur.

The temple was built by Shri Chunilal Bakhtawar Mehta Charitable Trust, Mumbai.

The temple is full of silver ornamental work. The front of Temple has an assembly hall which can accommodate about 300 people.

About Rani

Rani is a city in Pali District in Indian state of Rajasthan. It lies on the Sukri River, a tributary of the Luni. Rani, Rajasthan is an important railway station on Ahmedabad-Delhi railway line. There are also few picnic points Sai Dham and Gori-shankar around Rani is truly beautiful.

Rani is the nearest railhead to famous Shri parswanath jain varkana temples. The temples are at distance of 7 km from Rani. Rani, Rajasthan has many small scale industries.

Around 1940 Rani, Rajasthan initially have only Railway station on Bombay-Baroda Central Indian Railway (BB&CI).

See also
 Rani, Rajasthan

References
 Sai-Dham Rani

Pali district
Hindu temples in Rajasthan
Sai Baba of Shirdi